Kilwa Kivinje Historic Site (Swahili Mji wa Kale wa Kivinje) is protected historic site located on Kilwa Kivinje ward in Kilwa District in Lindi Region of Tanzania's Indian Ocean coast. The site is home to medieval Swahili ruins and some surviving Swahili buildings from the late 19th century. The settlement is considered to be the refuge of the earlier inhabitants of Kilwa Kisiwani who had fled Vasco da Gama sacking of the city in 1505 and also absorbed more refugees fleeing the Madagascar pirates in 1822.

See also
Historic Swahili Settlements
National Historic Sites in Tanzania
Swahili architecture

References

Swahili people
Swahili city-states
Swahili culture
Uninhabited islands of Tanzania
National Historic Sites in Tanga Region
National Historic Sites in Tanzania
Archaeological sites in Tanzania